Persse is a surname. Notable people with the surname include:
Atty Persse (1869–1960), Champion English racehorse trainer 
Dudley Persse (1625–1699), Anglo-Irish landlord
Henry Persse (1885–1918), English cricketer
Henry Stratford Persse (died 1833), Irish writer
Isabella Augusta Persse (best known as Lady Gregory; 1852–1932), Anglo-Irish playwright, poet, translator and chatelaine 
Lee-Ann Persse (born 1988), South African rower
Sarah Persse (fl. 1899), Irish women's rights activist
William Persse (c. 1728–1802), Irish volunteer

See also
Perse (disambiguation)